NGC 6633 is a large bright open cluster in the constellation Ophiuchus. Discovered in 1745-46 by Philippe Loys de Chéseaux, it was independently rediscovered by Caroline Herschel in 1783 and included in her brother William's catalog as H VIII.72. Bright enough to be seen with the naked eye, the cluster is considered a fine object for binoculars or small telescopes.

NGC 6633 is also known as the Tweedledum Cluster (paired with IC 4756 as Tweedledee), also as the Captain Hook Cluster. It is also designated Collinder 380 or Melotte 201. Nearly as large as the full moon, the cluster contains 38 known stars and shines with a total magnitude of 4.6; the brightest star is of mag 7.6. Its age has been estimated at 660 million years.

The cluster contains at least one chemically peculiar star - NGC 6633 48 (BD+06 3755).

The 8th-magnitude binary star HD 169959 (NGC 6633 58) is within the line-of-sight of the open cluster but is not physically associated with it.

References

External links 
 
 

6633
Open clusters
Ophiuchus (constellation)